Russell Heap (born 6 December 1968) is an English former first-class cricketer.

Heap was born at Leeds and was educated at Ipswich School, before going up to Magdalene College, Cambridge. While studying at Cambridge, he made his debut in first-class cricket for Cambridge University against Essex at Fenner's in 1988. He played first-class cricket for Cambridge until 1990, making a further nineteen appearances. He scored 669 runs in his twenty matches, at an average of 20.90.

Heap made his highest first-class score of 63 in the first innings of Cambridge's victory over Sussex in 1990, and in the second innings he hit a six to win the match. It was Cambridge's first victory over a county side for eight years. In addition to playing first-class cricket, Heap also played minor counties cricket for Suffolk in 1988 and 1989, making four appearances in the Minor Counties Championship.

References

External links

1968 births
Living people
Cricketers from Leeds
People educated at Ipswich School
Alumni of Magdalene College, Cambridge
English cricketers
Cambridge University cricketers
Suffolk cricketers